TAME Flight 120 was a Boeing 727-134 airliner, registration HC-BLF, named El Oro, operating as a scheduled international passenger flight between Quito, Ecuador and Cali, Colombia, with a scheduled stopover at the Ecuadorian border town of Tulcán. The aircraft crashed while on approach to Tulcán's Teniente Coronel Luis A. Mantilla International Airport on January 28, 2002. The pilot flew the approach incorrectly in reportedly foggy conditions, and the aircraft crashed into the side of the Cumbal Volcano, located near Ipiales, Colombia, at 10:23 in the morning. All passengers and crew were killed in the crash.

Aircraft and crew 

The aircraft involved had first flown in 1967 and was previously operated by Transair Sweden, Air Madeira, and Philippine Airlines before being transferred to TAME. 

The captain was 59-year-old Jorge Efrain Noe, one of TAME's flight instructors and most experienced pilots, having logged a total of 12,091 flight hours, including 8,263 hours on the Boeing 727. The first officer was 52-year-old Carlos Alfonso Lopez, who was undergoing training to become a captain. He had 7,058 flight hours with 3,457 of them on the Boeing 727. The flight engineer was 50-year-old Jorge Anibal Burgos Villamar, who had 4,200 flight hours including 3,000 hours on the Boeing 727. 

First officer Lopez was the pilot flying on the accident flight and occupied the left seat, while captain Noe occupied the right seat and acted as pilot-in-command.

Flight chronology
The Boeing 727-100 departed Quito at 10:03 local time, taking off from Runway 17. The first leg, between Quito and Tulcán, was a short one. At 10:15 HC-BLF made contact with the Tulcán control tower, at which point it was positioned  from the Tulcán NDB.

El Oro entered the approach from the southwest, passing slightly west of the NDB, as opposed to directly over it. This took the 727 wide of its intended course; by the time it came around to a westerly heading, it was flying not towards the runway, but into the side of the Cumbal Volcano.

The aircraft crashed into the side of the mountain at 10:23 AM, after which no further contact was made with the flight. Visibility was very poor at the time of the accident; the wreckage was not found until almost a day later.

Investigation

The investigation committee of the Special Administrative Unit of Civil Aeronautics (Colombia) found the probable cause of the accident to be the following:

References

External links

 Special Administrative Unit of Civil Aeronautics
Preliminary report (Archive)
Final report (Archive) 
 Report on the poor design of the approach to SETU (Archive)
 Web site about the accident 

2002 in Colombia
Aviation accidents and incidents in 2002
Aviation accidents and incidents in Colombia
Accidents and incidents involving the Boeing 727
Airliner accidents and incidents involving controlled flight into terrain
Airliner accidents and incidents caused by pilot error
Man-made disasters in Colombia
TAME accidents and incidents
January 2002 events in South America
2002 disasters in Colombia